Baptiste Schmisser (born 26 February 1986) is a French footballer who currently plays for URSL Visé as a centre-back.

Career

KM Torhout
On 31 August 2019, Schmisser joined KM Torhout.

References

External links
 
 

Living people
1986 births
Footballers from Metz
Association football defenders
French footballers
French expatriate footballers
Belgian Pro League players
Challenger Pro League players
K.V. Oostende players
Royal Antwerp F.C. players
K.S.V. Roeselare players
Expatriate footballers in Belgium
French expatriate sportspeople in Belgium